CTT or CTT Correios de Portugal, S.A. is the national postal service of Portugal.

CTT may also refer to:
 Cycling Time Trials, the governing body for time trialling in the UK
CTT (Macau), the Macau Post Office
 Classical test theory
 Columbia TriStar Television
 ConcurTaskTrees
 Custom Air Transport's ICAO code
 CTT, a specialty certification of Comp TIA
CTT, a codon for the amino acid Leucine
 × Cattlianthe (Ctt.), a nothogenus of orchids